The Compendium of Macromolecular Nomenclature, by the International Union of Pure and Applied Chemistry (IUPAC), provides definition of polymer related terms and rules of nomenclature of polymers. It is referred to as the Purple Book. It was published in 1991 by Blackwell Science. The author of this book is W.V. Metanomski.

The expansion of this book named Compendium of Polymer Terminology and Nomenclature: IUPAC Recommendations, 2008 was published by the Royal Society of Chemistry in 2009.

The rules and definitions were set up by the IUPAC Commission on Macromolecular Nomenclature. The work was carried on by the Subcommittee on Polymer Terminology (IUPAC Division IV) after the Commission on Macromolecular Nomenclature was terminated.

See also
 International Union of Pure and Applied Chemistry nomenclature
Compendium of Chemical Terminology (the Gold Book)
 Nomenclature of Organic Chemistry (the Blue Book)
 Nomenclature of Inorganic Chemistry (the Red Book)
 Quantities, Units and Symbols in Physical Chemistry (the Green Book)
 Compendium of Analytical Nomenclature (the Orange Book)

References

External links
 PDF version of book from IUPAC.org
Compendium of Macromolecular Nomenclature (from old.IUPAC.org)
 Preview of the Purple Book at Google books

Polymer chemistry
Chemistry reference works
Chemical nomenclature
2009 non-fiction books
Royal Society of Chemistry